Elachista argentifasciella is a moth of the family Elachistidae. It is found in Italy, Switzerland and Austria.

References

argentifasciella
Moths described in 1898
Moths of Europe
Taxa named by Gabriel Höfner